Fort Clark Springs is an unincorporated community and census-designated place (CDP) in Kinney County, Texas, United States. The population was 1,228 at the 2010 census. It is the site of the former Fort Clark, now a historic district.

Geography
The community is located in central Kinney County and is bordered to the north by Brackettville, the county seat. U.S. Route 90 runs along the border between the two communities, leading east  to Uvalde and west  to Del Rio. Texas State Highway 131 runs along the east edge of the CDP, leading south  to U.S. Route 277 in the Rio Grande valley.

References

Census-designated places in Kinney County, Texas
Census-designated places in Texas